Buskerud is one of the 19 multi-member constituencies of the Storting, the national legislature of Norway. The constituency was established in 1921 following the introduction of proportional representation for elections to the Storting. It consists of the municipalities of Ål, Drammen, Flå, Gol, Hemsedal, Hol, Hole, Jevnaker, Kongsberg, Krødsherad, Lier, Modum, Nesbyen, Nore og Uvdal, Øvre Eiker, Ringerike, Rollag and Sigdal in the county of Viken. The constituency currently elects seven of the 169 members of the Storting using the open party-list proportional representation electoral system. At the 2021 parliamentary election it had 191,637 registered electors.

Electoral system
Buskerud currently elects seven of the 169 members of the Storting using the open party-list proportional representation electoral system. Constituency seats are allocated by the County Electoral Committee using the Modified Sainte-Laguë method. Compensatory seats (seats at large) are calculated based on the national vote and are allocated by the National Electoral Committee using the Modified Sainte-Laguë method at the constituency level (one for each constituency). Only parties that reach the 4% national threshold compete for compensatory seats.

Election results

Summary

(Excludes compensatory seats. Figures in italics represent joint lists.)

Detailed

2020s

2021
Results of the 2021 parliamentary election held on 13 September 2021:

The following candidates were elected:
Sandra Bruflot (H); Lise Christoffersen (Ap); Masud Gharahkhani (Ap); Trond Helleland (H); Kathy Lie (SV); Per Olaf Lundteigen (Sp); Even A. Røed (Ap); and Morten Wold (FrP).

2010s

2017
Results of the 2017 parliamentary election held on 11 September 2017:

The following candidates were elected:
Lise Christoffersen (Ap); Jon Engen-Helgheim (FrP); Masud Gharahkhani (Ap); Trond Helleland (H); Kristin Ørmen Johnsen (H); Martin Kolberg (Ap); Per Olaf Lundteigen (Sp); Arne Nævra (SV); and Morten Wold (FrP).

2013
Results of the 2013 parliamentary election held on 8 and 9 September 2013:

The following candidates were elected:
Lise Christoffersen (Ap); Trond Helleland (H); Kristin Ørmen Johnsen (H); Martin Kolberg (Ap); Per Olaf Lundteigen (Sp); Torgeir Micaelsen (Ap); Jørund Rytman (FrP); Anders B. Werp (H); and Morten Wold (FrP).

2000s

2009
Results of the 2009 parliamentary election held on 13 and 14 September 2009:

The following candidates were elected:
Lise Christoffersen (Ap); Laila Gustavsen (Ap); Trond Helleland (H); Martin Kolberg (Ap); Ulf Erik Knudsen (FrP); Per Olaf Lundteigen (Sp); Torgeir Micaelsen (Ap); Jørund Rytman (FrP); and Anders B. Werp (H).

2005
Results of the 2005 parliamentary election held on 11 and 12 September 2005:

The following candidates were elected:
Magnar Lund Bergo (SV); Lise Christoffersen (Ap); Sigrun Eng (Ap); Trond Helleland (H); Thorbjørn Jagland (Ap); Ulf Erik Knudsen (FrP); Per Olaf Lundteigen (Sp); Torgeir Micaelsen (Ap); and Jørund Rytman (FrP).

2001
Results of the 2001 parliamentary election held on 9 and 10 September 2001:

The following candidates were elected:
Magnar Lund Bergo (SV); Sigrun Eng (Ap); Trond Helleland (H); Beate Heieren Hundhammer (H); Thorbjørn Jagland (Ap); Ulf Erik Knudsen (FrP); and Finn Kristian Marthinsen (KrF).

1990s

1997
Results of the 1997 parliamentary election held on 15 September 1997:

The following candidates were elected:
Erik Dalheim (Ap); Sigrun Eng (Ap); Kirsti Kolle Grøndahl (Ap); Trond Helleland (H); Thorbjørn Jagland (Ap); Ulf Erik Knudsen (FrP); and Finn Kristian Marthinsen (KrF).

1993
Results of the 1993 parliamentary election held on 12 and 13 September 1993:

The following candidates were elected:
Hallgrim Berg (H); Erik Dalheim (Ap); Sigrun Eng (Ap); Kirsti Kolle Grøndahl (Ap); Arild Hiim (H); Thorbjørn Jagland (Ap); Per Olaf Lundteigen (Sp); and Roy Wetterstad (FrP).

1980s

1989
Results of the 1989 parliamentary election held on 10 and 11 September 1989:

The following candidates were elected:
Hallgrim Berg (H); Erik Dalheim (Ap); Kirsti Kolle Grøndahl (Ap); Arild Hiim (H); Trond Jensrud (Ap); Åse Klundelien (Ap); and Steinar Maribo (FrP).

1985
Results of the 1985 parliamentary election held on 8 and 9 September 1985:

As the list alliance was entitled to more seats contesting as an alliance than it was contesting as individual parties, the distribution of seats was as list alliance votes. The Sp-KrF list alliance's additional seat was allocated to the Centre Party.

The following candidates were elected:
Hallgrim Berg (H); Johan Buttedahl (Sp); Erik Dalheim (Ap); Kirsti Kolle Grøndahl (Ap); Aase Moløkken (Ap); Olaf Øen (Ap); and Mona Røkke (H).

1981
Results of the 1981 parliamentary election held on 13 and 14 September 1981:

Errors in the conduct of the election resulted in a re-run of the election on 6 and 7 December 1981:

The following candidates were elected:
Johan Buttedahl (Sp); Erik Dalheim (Ap); Kirsti Kolle Grøndahl (Ap); Aase Moløkken (Ap); Olaf Øen (Ap); Mona Røkke (H); and Hans E. Strand (H).

1970s

1977
Results of the 1977 parliamentary election held on 11 and 12 September 1977:

The following candidates were elected:
Kirsti Kolle Grøndahl (Ap); Gunnar Thorleif Hvashovd (Ap); Olaf Øen (Ap); Tor Oftedal (Ap); Mona Røkke (H); Hans E. Strand (H); and Hans Torgersen (KrF-V-DNF).

1973
Results of the 1973 parliamentary election held on 9 and 10 September 1973:

The following candidates were elected:
Ragnar Christiansen (Ap); Kåre Øistein Hansen (SV); Gunnar Thorleif Hvashovd (Ap); Gunnar Johnsen (H); Olaf Knudson (H); Tor Oftedal (Ap); and Erland Steenberg (Sp).

1960s

1969
Results of the 1969 parliamentary election held on 7 and 8 September 1969:

The following candidates were elected:
Ragnar Christiansen (Ap); Gunnar Thorleif Hvashovd (Ap); Bernt Ingvaldsen (H); Guri Johannessen (Ap); Olaf Knudson (H); Tor Oftedal (Ap); and Erland Steenberg (Sp).

1965
Results of the 1965 parliamentary election held on 12 and 13 September 1965:

The following candidates were elected:
Sverre Oddvar Andresen (Ap); Ragnar Christiansen (Ap); Bernt Ingvaldsen (H); Guri Johannessen (Ap); Olaf Knudson (H); Erland Steenberg (Sp); and Reidar Strømdahl (Ap).

1961
Results of the 1961 parliamentary election held on 11 September 1961:

The following candidates were elected:
Botolv Bråtalien (Sp), 9,307 votes; Ragnar Christiansen (Ap), 52,695 votes; Bernt Ingvaldsen (H), 19,885 votes; Guri Johannessen (Ap), 52,694 votes; Olaf Knudson (H), 19,888 votes; Gunnar Mykstu (Ap), 52,695 votes; and Olaf Watnebryn (Ap), 52,691 votes.

1950s

1957
Results of the 1957 parliamentary election held on 7 October 1957:

The following candidates were elected:
Botolv Bråtalien (Bp); Ragnar Christiansen (Ap); Bernt Ingvaldsen (H); Guri Johannessen (Ap); Olaf Knudson (H); Gunnar Mykstu (Ap); and Olaf Watnebryn (Ap).

1953
Results of the 1953 parliamentary election held on 12 October 1953:

The following candidates were elected:
Hans Oskar Evju (Bp); Bernt Ingvaldsen (H); Konrad Knudsen (Ap); Olaf Knudson (H); Astrid Skare (Ap); Olaf Sørensen (Ap); and Olaf Watnebryn (Ap).

1940s

1949
Results of the 1949 parliamentary election held on 10 October 1949:

The following candidates were elected:
Lars Breie (Ap); Hans Oskar Evju (Bp-V); Torolv Kandahl (H); Konrad Knudsen (Ap); and Astrid Skare (Ap).

1945
Results of the 1945 parliamentary election held on 8 October 1945:

As the list alliances was not entitled to more seats contesting as an alliance than it was contesting as individual parties, the distribution of seats was as party votes.

The following candidates were elected:
Kittill Kristoffersen Berg (K); Lars Breie (Ap); Konrad Knudsen (Ap); Astrid Skare (Ap); and Gudbrand Bernhardsen Tandberg (BS).

1930s

1936
Results of the 1936 parliamentary election held on 19 October 1936:

The following candidates were elected:
Jon Reinholdt Aas (BS-Bp-V); Jens Hundseid (BS-Bp-V); Hans Johan Jensen (Ap); Konrad Knudsen (Ap); and Nils Andreas Steen (Ap).

1933
Results of the 1933 parliamentary election held on 16 October 1933:

As the list alliance was not entitled to more seats contesting as an alliance than it was contesting as individual parties, the distribution of seats was as party votes.

The following candidates were elected:
Jon Reinholdt Aas (LS); Christopher Hornsrud (Ap); Hans Johan Jensen (Ap); Nils Andreas Steen (Ap); and Christian Hansen Tandberg (Bp).

1930
Results of the 1930 parliamentary election held on 20 October 1930:

The following candidates were elected:
Jon Reinholdt Aas (LS); Christopher Hornsrud (Ap); Harald Saue (Bp); Nils Andreas Steen (Ap); and Ivar Engebretsen Tufte (LS).

1920s

1927
Results of the 1927 parliamentary election held on 17 October 1927:

The following candidates were elected:
Jon Reinholdt Aas (LS); Christopher Hornsrud (Ap); Hans Johan Jensen (Ap); Harald Saue (Bp); and Nils Andreas Steen (Ap).

1924
Results of the 1924 parliamentary election held on 21 October 1924:

The following candidates were elected:
Jon Reinholdt Aas (LS); Christopher Hornsrud (Ap); Kristen Christoffersen Kopseng (LS); Harald Saue (Bp); and Nils Andreas Steen (Ap).

1921
Results of the 1921 parliamentary election held on 24 October 1921:

The following candidates were elected:
Jon Reinholdt Aas (LS); Christopher Hornsrud (Ap); Kristen Christoffersen Kopseng (LS); Eugène Olaussen (Ap); and Bernt Severinsen (LS).

Notes

References

Storting constituency
Storting constituencies
Storting constituencies established in 1921